The Atoyac River is a river of Mexico located in the state of Guerrero.

In 1992's Hurricane Virgil, A flood on the Atoyac River washed away 500 homes in Guerrero, which prompted the evacuation of 2,500 people.

See also
List of rivers of Mexico

References

Atlas of Mexico, 1975 (http://www.lib.utexas.edu/maps/atlas_mexico/river_basins.jpg).
The Prentice Hall American World Atlas, 1984.
Rand McNally, The New International Atlas, 1993.

Rivers of Guerrero